Terence Dean Brooks (born January 8, 1944) is an American writer of fantasy fiction. He writes mainly epic fantasy, and has also written two film novelizations. He has written 23 New York Times bestsellers during his writing career, and has sold over 25 million copies of his books in print. He is one of the biggest-selling living fantasy writers.

Early life
Brooks was born in the rural Midwestern town of Sterling, Illinois, and spent a large part of his life living there. He is an alumnus of Hamilton College, earning his B.A. in English literature in 1966. He later obtained a J.D. degree from Washington and Lee University. He was a practising attorney before becoming a full-time author.

Career

Brooks had been a writer since high school, writing mainly in the genres of science fiction, western, fiction, and non-fiction. One day, in his early college life, he was given a copy of J. R. R. Tolkien's The Lord of the Rings, which inspired him to write in one genre. While Tolkien inspired the genre, Brooks stated during his TEDxRainier talk "Why I Write about Elves", as well as at the Charlotte Literary Festival that he credits the inspiration of his style of writing to William Faulkner's works. With this inspiration, he then made his debut in 1977 with The Sword of Shannara.

After finishing two sequels to The Sword of Shannara, Brooks moved on to the series which would become known as the Landover novels. Brooks then wrote a four-book series titled The Heritage of Shannara. For the next fourteen years, he wrote more Landover books, then went on to write The Word and Void trilogy.  Continuing the Shannara series, Brooks wrote the prequel to The Sword of Shannara, titled First King of Shannara.  He then wrote two series, The Voyage of the Jerle Shannara and High Druid of Shannara and finished a third, Genesis of Shannara, a trilogy bridging his Word and Void and Shannara series.  The sixth book in the Landover series, A Princess of Landover, was released in August 2009. 
Returning to Shannara, a duology, Legends of Shannara, taking place after the events of Genesis of Shannara, was written next. The first book, entitled Bearers of the Black Staff, was released in August 2010 and the second, The Measure of the Magic, was released in August 2011.
He next completed a trilogy entitled The Dark Legacy of Shannara. The three books are; Wards of Faerie (Feb 2013), Bloodfire Quest (June 2013), and Witch Wraith (Dec 2013). He followed this with the trilogy Defenders of Shannara, which include The High Druid's Blade (July 2014), The Darkling Child (June 2015), and The Sorcerer's Daughter (May 24, 2016).
According to his website, he is currently working on the final and concluding tetralogy of the Shannara series known as The Fall of Shannara. The first book in the tetralogy is The Black Elfstone and was released on June 13, 2017. The second book in the series is The Skaar Invasion  released on June 19, 2018. The third book in the series is The Stiehl Assassin published on May 28, 2019. The fourth and final book in the tetralogy is The Last Druid, published on October 20, 2020.

A television series based on the Shannara works, entitled The Shannara Chronicles, began showing on MTV in January 2016. The show starts with the second book of the original series, Elfstones, as there are strong female roles which did not appear in the first book. The second season aired in 2017 on Spike TV. On January 16, 2018, it was announced that the series had been cancelled after two seasons. Producers later announced that the series is being shopped to other networks.

Brooks has written a number of other books, based on movies, science fiction and his own life. Novels include Hook, based on the movie of the same name, first published November 24, 1991, and republished in 1998. Star Wars Episode I: The Phantom Menace (novel) was published April 21, 1999, with four differing dust jacket covers. His own writing life is reflected in two stories, Sometimes the Magic Works: Lessons from a Writing Life, published February 3, 2004, and Why I Write About Elves published in 2005. A science fiction book, Street Freaks, was released on October 2, 2018. Brooks has written a number of e-book short stories which are published in a book titled Small Magic with his other short stories.

Personal life
Brooks resides in Seattle, Washington, with his wife, Judine.

Novels versus short stories
After writing "Indomitable", a short story constituting an epilogue to The Wishsong of Shannara, Terry Brooks declared:

Bibliography

References

External links

Reddit AMA

1944 births
Living people
American fantasy writers
20th-century American novelists
21st-century American novelists
Writers of books about writing fiction
Hamilton College (New York) alumni
World Fantasy Award-winning writers
Writers from Seattle
People from Sterling, Illinois
Shannara
Washington and Lee University School of Law alumni
American male novelists
Inkpot Award winners
Novelists from Washington (state)
20th-century American male writers
21st-century American male writers